Mastermind LP, trading as Mastermind Toys, is a Canadian chain of toy stores. Based in Scarborough, Toronto, Ontario, the company was founded in 1984 by brothers Andy and Jonathan Levy, and is now privately owned by Birch Hill Private Equity.

History 
Brothers Andy and Jonathan Levy opened "Mastermind: The Educational Computer Store" in 1984 as a 300-square-foot shop in Toronto, Ontario, Canada that sold educational software for home computers. A second shop called "Mastermind Educational" was opened in 1985 with an expanded selection of toys, books, and games. Mastermind Educational began offering complimentary in-store gift wrapping with a custom wrap designed in-house. Proving successful, the chain began to expand. 

The first store (300 square feet) opened in 1984 and the second opened in 1985. Through the 1990s, 10 locations across the GTA were established and in 1997 its website mastermindtoys.com launched. 

In 2005, Mastermind Educational rebranded to Mastermind Toys and in 2007, opened its eleventh store in the GTA. 

In 2010, Mastermind Toys was acquired by Birch Hill Private Equity Partners to help the company expand across Canada. Co-founder Andy Levy retired and Jon Levy stayed on as CEO. Within the decade, Mastermind Toys expanded to 57 new stores coast-to-coast.  

In 2019, Jon Levy retired and in January 2020, Sarah Jordan was appointed CEO of Mastermind Toys. Sarah Jordan was formerly a Principal at The Boston Consulting Group and Senior Vice President of Customer Experience and Omni Channel Strategy at Scotiabank.

The Globe and Mail contrasted Mastermind Toys to its main competitors, Toys "R" Us and Walmart, by classifying it as a mid-size "specialty retail" chain with a focus on premium and "trend-proof" products, as opposed to big-box rivals "sustained by branded plastic".

References

External links 

Companies based in Scarborough, Toronto
Retail companies established in 1984
Canadian brands
1984 establishments in Ontario
Toy retailers of Canada